Bishop's Falls is a town in the north-central part of the island of Newfoundland in the Canadian province of Newfoundland and Labrador, with a population of 3,082 at the 2021 census.

Geography
It is in Division No. 6, on the Exploits River, near the town of Grand Falls-Windsor and the town of Botwood.  It is commonly thought of as having the warmest summer temperatures in all of Newfoundland and Labrador.

History
The railroad played a major part in the area's history, as the town was a central hub during the travels of the "Newfie Bullet" train. There is a trestle in the town which is the longest east of Quebec. The existing trestle is the last of many which were built and destroyed by the strong ice flows (and a flood) that occur in the winter. The town sits along the Exploits River which flows through and to the falls from which the town takes its name.

Bishop's Falls also boasts a famous NHL player name, Alex Faulkner who played with Gordie Howe.

Demographics 

Notable people
 Alex Faulkner, first National Hockey League player from Newfoundland and Labrador
 George Faulkner, first professional hockey player from Newfoundland and Labrador (minor-pro)
 Scott Simms, MP - former Member of Parliament and former Weather Network broadcaster
 Ronald Harrison "Ron" Pelley, Visual and Digital Artist

See also
 List of cities and towns in Newfoundland and Labrador

References

External links
Town of Bishop's Falls

Towns in Newfoundland and Labrador